"Homebreaker" is a song written by Skeeter Davis and Marie Wilson. In 1959, Skeeter Davis recorded and released the song as a single for RCA Victor.

"Homebreaker" was recorded and released as a single in July 1959 at the RCA Victor Studio in Nashville, Tennessee, United States. and peaked at number fifteen on the Billboard Magazine Hot C&W Sides chart later that year. The single was Davis' third major hit single on the country chart. The song was not originally issued onto an official album.

Chart performance

References 

1959 songs
Skeeter Davis songs
Songs written by Skeeter Davis
Song recordings produced by Chet Atkins
1959 singles
RCA Victor singles